Dudek is a surname of Slavic origin, coming from the territories of Poland, Czech Republic and Slovakia. From Polish it means "a hoopoe". The Czech/Slovak feminine form is Dudková.

People 
 Alyson Dudek (born 1990), American speed skater
 Anne Dudek (born 1975), American actress
 Dariusz Dudek (born 1975), Polish footballer
 Gerd Dudek (1938–2022), German jazz tenor
 Gregory Dudek, Canadian computer science/robotics researcher
 Jerzy Dudek (born 1973), Polish footballer
 Joe Dudek (born 1964), American football player
 Les Dudek (born 1952), American guitarist
 Louis Dudek (1918-2001), Canadian poet
 Michal Dudek (born 1990), Czech speedway rider
 Patryk Dudek (born 1992), Polish speedway rider
 Paulina Dudek (born 1997), Polish footballer
 Sebastian Dudek (born 1980), Polish footballer

Other uses 
 Dudek Paragliders, a Polish paraglider manufacturer, founded by Piotr Dudek

See also

References

Polish-language surnames
Czech-language surnames